Chen Ching-Po (born 1 October 1931) is a Taiwanese professional golfer. He represented Chinese Taipei in 11 successive Canada Cup tournaments from 1956 to 1966 and won the Japan Open Golf Championship in 1959.

He was described as the "Ben Hogan of Asia" by Gene Sarazen due to the similarities between their swings.

Professional wins (16)

Asia Golf Circuit wins (1)
1968 Yomiuri International

Other wins (11)
1959 Japan Open Golf Championship
1960 White Bear Cup
1962 Kanto Open, White Bear Cup
1964 Kanto Pro Championship, Golf Nippon Series, Champions Tournament
1965 Champions Tournament
1966 Grand Monarch, Champions Tournament
1967 Narashino Million

Senior wins (4)
1981 Japan PGA Senior Championship
1982 Kanto PGA Senior Championship
1983 Kanto PGA Senior Championship
1985 Kanto PGA Senior Championship

Results in major championships

"T" indicates a tie for a place
Note: Chen only played in the Masters Tournament and The Open Championship.

Team appearances
Canada Cup (representing Chinese Taipei): 1956, 1957, 1958, 1959, 1960, 1961, 1962, 1963, 1964, 1965, 1966

References

External links

Japan Professional Golf Hall Of Fame 

Taiwanese male golfers
1931 births
Living people